Eboda chrisitis is a species of moth of the family Tortricidae. It is found on Borneo.

References

Moths described in 1964
Tortricini
Moths of Indonesia
Taxa named by Józef Razowski